Nancy Van de Vate (born December 30, 1930) is an American-born composer living in Austria.

Life and career
Van de Vate was born in Plainfield, New Jersey. She studied piano at Eastman School of Music and music theory at Wellesley College and completed graduate degrees in music composition at the University of Mississippi and Florida State University. She later pursued further studies in electronic music at Dartmouth College and the University of New Hampshire and is known worldwide for her music in the large forms. Her first professional performance (1958) was of the Adagio for orchestra. During the early part of her career she taught at various North American universities and worked as a violist and pianist.

She taught at Memphis State University (1964–66), the University of Tennessee (1967), Knoxville College (1968–69; 1971–72), Maryville College (1973–74), the University of Hawaii (1975-76), and Hawaii Loa College (1977–80).

In 1975, Van de Vate founded the League of Women Composers and served as chairperson until 1982. (later renamed the International League of Women Composers, now part of the International Alliance for Women in Music).

Van de Vate now lives permanently in Vienna, Austria and teaches composition at the Institute for European Studies in Vienna. In 2010 the IES named her Composer-in-Residence.

Selected works

Opera
 Hamlet 2009, Opera in five acts, after Shakespeare, recorded 2011, premiered by The University of Mississippi's Opera Theatre Group April 18, 2015
Where the Cross is Made, 2003, Opera in three acts, Libretto based on the play by Eugene O'Neill, 60' VM
Premiere: 2005, Normal IL, US, Illinois State University Opera, Karyl K. Carlson; Cond.
Rec. VMM 4006, 2006, Michelle Vought, sop, Christopher Hollingsworth, bar, Timothy Schmidt, bass, Clinton Desmond, ten. 
Soprano, tenor, baritone, bass, 1/1/1/1 – 1 - 2 perc, pn/cel-str.(3,3,2,2,2)
Im Westen nichts Neues, 2002, Opera in three acts, libretto after the novel by Erich Maria Remarque, 95', VM.
Premiere: 2003, Osnabrück Opera, Germany, Hermann Bäumer, Cond. 
(see below)
All Quiet on the Western Front, Opera in three acts, 1999, libretto after the novel by Erich Maria Remarque, 95', VM.
Prem. 2003, New York City Opera ("Showcasing American Composers"), George Manahan, Cond. Rec. VMM 4004 (2 CDs), 2002, Moravian Philharmonic and soloists from the Janáček Opera, Toshiyuki Shimada, Cond.
2 tenors, 2 baritones, bass, soprano, mezzo, orch: 2/2/2/2 - 2/2/2/0 - 3 perc - hp – str
Nemo: Jenseits von Vulkania, Opera in four acts, libretto: Allen Cortes and Nancy Van de Vate, 1995, 150', VM.
Rec. VMM 4002 (2 CDs), 2001. Moravian Philharmonic and soloists from the Janáček Opera, Toshiyuki Shimada, Cond.
2 sopranos, alto, tenor, baritone, bass, SATB chorus - orch: 3/3/3/3 -4/4/3/1 - timp,
3 perc - hp, pf, cel – str
Nemo: Beyond Vulkania. Opera in four acts in English, with medium orchestra
(see above)

Orchestral
Suite for String Orchestra after Mechthild from Magdeburg, 2000, 8', Vienna Masterworks
Premiere: Oct. 3, 2000, Scarlatti di Napoli Orchester, Rome, Italy, Daniele Moles, Cond.
Adagio and Rondo for Violin and String Orchestra, 1994, 9'42", VM
Premiere: July 25, 1994, Sala Balowa, Lancut, Poland, Joanna Kawalla, vn, Lancut Festival Orchestra, S. Kawalla; Cond. Rec. VMM CD 3025, 1994, Joanna Kawalla, Vn, Koszalin Philharmonic, Poland, S. Kawalla; Cond.
Concerto for Piano and Orchestra, 1968, rev. 1994, 22' VM
Premiere: April 26, 1969, University of Alabama Symphony, Tuscaloosa, Alabama; Franklin Choset; Cond., Sallie Schoen, pf; Prem. (rev.) Nov.11,1993, Koszalin, Poland, Makiko Hirashima, pf, Koszalin Phil. Orch., Szymon Kawalla; Cond. Rec. VMM CD 3025, 1994, KSPO, Hirashima, Kawalla 
3/2/2/2 - 4/2/3/1 - timp, 2 perc - str 
Four Somber Songs, 1992, Texts by Georg Trakl, Edgar Allan Poe, William Blake, Paul Verlaine, 13', VM
Rec. VMM CD 3013, 1992, Slovak Radio Orchestra, Szymon Kawalla; Cond., Sulie Girardi, mezzo
2/2/2/2 - 2/0/1/1 - 1 perc - hp - str 
Viola Concerto, 1990, 16', VM
Premiere: September 14, 1993, Kraków, Poland, Grigorij Zhislin, Viola, Polish Radio Orch. of Kraków, José Maria Florêncio Junior; Cond. Rec. VMM CD 3023, 1993, PRSO, Zhislin, Florêncio
3/3/3/3 - 4/3/3/1 – timp, 3 perc - hp, pf, cel - str
Kraków Concerto for Percussion and Orchestra, 1988, 25', VM 
Premiere: November 28, 1989, Kraków Percussion Ensemble, PRO, Szymon Kawalla; Cond. Rec. Conifer (London) CDCF 185 (1988–92); VMM CD 3015, 1992, PRO, Kawalla
3/2/2/2 - 4/3/3/1 – timp. 5 perc - hp, pf/cel - str
Chernobyl, 1987, 13', VM 
Premiere: May 18, 1995, Vienna, Austria, Niederösterreichisches Tonkünstlerorchester, Peter Keuschnig; Cond. Rec. Conifer CDCF 168 (1988–92), VMM CD 3010, 1992, PRO, 
Kawalla
3/3/3/3 - 4/3/3/1 - timp, 3 perc - cel, hp, pf - str (12/10/8/8/6)
Suite für Chor aus "Nemo", 1997, Texts: Allen Cortes and Nancy Van de Vate, 24', Rec. VMM CD 3043, 1998, VMM 4001, 1999, Ars Brunensis Chorus, Moravian Philharmonic, Toshiyuki Shimada; Cond.
SATB, Boy soprano, 3/3/3/3 - 4/4/3/1 - 4 perc - hp – str
Choral Suite from "Nemo" (English), as above
An American Essay, 1994, Texts: Walt Whitman, 30', VM 
Premiere: June 29, 1994, Koszalin, Poland, Chorus Soranus (Denmark), Christine Marstrand, soprano, Knud Vad, Choral Dir. Koszalin Philharmonic Orchestra. Kawalla, Cond. Rec. VMM CD 3025, 1994, KSO, Chorus Soranus, Marstrand, Kawalla
SATB, soprano 2/2/2/2 - 2/0/1/0 - 2 perc - hp - str
Voices of Women, 1993, Texts: James Joyce, Walt Whitman, Charles Baudelaire, anon. Provençal 12th Cent. 20', VM
Premiere 1993, Koszalin, Poland, Silesian University Choir, Sulie Girardi, Mezzo-soprano, Halina-Gorniewicz, Choral Director, Koszalin State Philharmonic Orchestra, Kawalla;
Recording: VMM CD 3022, 1993, Silesian University Choir, Sulie Girardi, KSPO, Kawalla.
SSA soprano, mezzo, picc/1/0/1/0 – 2 perc – hp, cel, str
How Fares the Night? 1993, Text: anon. Chinese, 5th century BC, trans. Mimi Tsoi,
4'30",VM
Premiere: 1993, Koszalin, Poland, Silesian University Choir, Joanna Kawalla, Vn, Halina
Gorniewicz, Choral Director, Koszalin State Phil. Orch., Szymon Kawalla, Cond.
Recording: 1993, Silesian University Choir, Joanna Kawalla, Vn, KSPO, Szymon Kawalla
SSAA, solo violin, string orchestra

Theatre Music

Venal Vera: Ode to a Gezira Lovely, 2000, 10' VM
Premiere: November 4, 2000, Toronto, Canada, Michelle Vought, soprano; Rec: VMM 4003, 2001, Michelle Vought, soprano
soprano or mezzo, bass cl, and 1 perc; or voice with tape
Cocaine Lil, 1986, 15', VM
Premiere: April 22, 1988,ensemble belcanto, Bremen, Germany; Recordings: Koch Schwann/Aulos CD 3-1432-2,1994, ensemble belcanto, Dietburg Spohr; VMM 2026, 1998, Blair Resicka; VMM 2034, 2001, Michelle Vought
mezzo or soprano, 4-8 jazz singers with small percussion. 
A Night in the Royal Ontario Museum, 1983, Text: Margaret Atwood, 12', VM 
Premiere: April 13, 1984, Marilyn DeReggi, Soprano, College Park, Maryland
Rec. VMM 2028, 1998, Michelle Vought
soprano and CD (Tape)
Eine Nacht im Royal Ontario Museum, 1983, 12', VM
Rec. VMM 4001, 1999, Sulie Girardi
(see above)

Music for strings
String Quartet No. 2, 2005, 17', VM
Premiere: Nov. 25, 2005, Austrian Radio Concert Hall, Vienna, Austria, 
H. Groh, vn, G. Hinterndorfer, vn, D. Ivanova, va, R. Flieder, vc
Divertimento for Harp and String Quintet, 1996, 18', VM
Rec. VMM 2034, 2001 Adriana Antalova, hp, Moravian PO String Quintet
hp + vn (2), va, vc, db
Seven Fantasy Pieces for Violin and Piano, 1989, 18', VM
Premiere: July 19, 1991,Paul Carlson, Vn, Nancy Van de Vate, Pf, Vienna, Austria
Rec. VMM 2034, 2001, Michael Davis, vn, Nelson Harper, pf
Trio for Violin, Cello and Piano, 1983, 13', VM
Premiere: March 24, 1984, Mexico City, Mexico, Nancy McAlhany, Vn, Maxine Neuman, Vc, Max Lifchitz, Pf. Recording: VMM CD 2001, 1990, Janusz Mirynski, Vn, Zdzislaw
Lapinski, vc, Marek Mitelski, pf
Letter to a Friend's Loneliness, 1976, Texts: John Unterecker,
10', VM
Premiere: November 8, 1976, Johnson City, Tennessee, US, Recording: VMM CD 2006, 1992, Sulie Girardi, Mezzo, Bohuslav Martinu Philharmonic String Quartet
soprano and string quartet
Concertpiece for Cello and Piano, 1976, VM
Suite for Solo Violin, 1975, 8', Sisra Publications
Premiere: December 12, 1976, The New School, New York. Recording: VMM CD 2006, 1992, Michael Davis,
Suite for Solo Viola, 1975, 8',VM
Prem. Nov. 2, 2006, Vienna, Austria, Jan Reznicek
Rec. VMM CD 2034, 2001, Kate Hamilton
Trio for Strings, 1974, 14',Arsis Press
Premiere: August 1975, Stowe, Vermont, Recordings: VMM CD 2006, 1992, Bohuslav
Martinu Philharmonic  String Trio; VMM CD 2026, 1997, Veronika String Trio
vn, va, vc
Six Etudes for Solo Viola, 1969, 9', Arsis Press
Premiere: December 24, 1974, New York City, Jacob Glick, Recording: VMM CD 2003, 1992, Michael Davis
Six Etudes for Solo Violin, 1969, 9',VM
Premiere: November 12, 1989, Paul Carlson, Pittsburg, Kansas
Recordings: VMM 2028, 1998, Michael Davis
 Keyboard Instruments
Twelve Pieces for Piano on One to Twelve Notes, Vol. III, 2005, 16', VM
Premiere, Vienna, Austria, Ruth Spindler, pf.
Balinese Diptych, 10', 2003, VM
Premiere: Sept. 9, 2003, Ananda Sukarlan, pf. Oslo, Norway. Rec. VMM 2043, 2007. A. Sukarlan.
Prelude for Organ, 2002, 4', VM
Premiere: June 9, 2002: Brad Maguire, Wellesley Mass. Rec. VMM 2043, 2007, Carlyn Morenus
Twelve Pieces for Piano on One to Twelve Notes, Vol. II, 2001, 19', VM
Premiere: August 15, 2001, Kathryn Rosenberg, Provincetown, Mass. Rec. VMM 2039, 2004 Thomas Hlawatsch
Fantasy Pieces for Piano, 1995, 10', VM
Premiere: March 5, 1996, Utrecht, the Netherlands, Ananda Sukarlan; Recording: VMM 2026,
1997, Makiko Hirashima
Night Journey, 1996, 8', VM
Premiere: April 19, 1997, Eisenstadt, Austria, Ruth Spindler. Rec. VMM 2028,
1998, Antoinette van Zabner
Twelve Pieces for Piano on One to Twelve Notes, Vol I, 1986, 18', VM
Premiere: July 19, 1990, Vienna, Austria, Ruth Spindler. Recording: VMM CD 2003,
1992, Ruth Spindler
Fantasy for Harpsichord, 1982, 4',VM
Premiere: May 6, 1983, Ann Arbor, Michigan, Michelle Edwards, Harpsichord; Recording:
VMM 2028, 1998, Ewa Gabrys
Sonata for Harpsichord, 1982, rev. 1996, 10', VM
Premiere: November 12, 1983, Davis, California; Recording: VMM 2026, 1997, Ewa Gabrys
MUSIC FOR WOODWINDS
Sonata for Clarinet and Piano, 1970, 13', VM
Premiere: Sept. 2005, Vienna, Austria, Ruth Spindler, pf, Katrin Gstöckenbauer, cl. 
Woodwind Quartet, 1964, 8', Southem Music Co.
Premiere: Autumn 1964, Interlochen, MI, Interlochen Arts Woodwind Quartet
fl, ob, cl, bn

Music for Brass
Trio for Horn, Violin and Piano, 2006, 17', VM
Prem. March 8, 2007, Haydnsaal, Vienna, Austria, Ferenc Leitner, hn., Ute Lehmann, vn., Maki Saeki, pf
Three Bagatelles for Four Trumpets 2006, 6' VM
Three Bagatelles for Four Horns 2006, 6' VM
Prem. August 5, 2006, Potsdam (Germany) Horn Quartet
Brass Quintet No. 2: Variations on "The Streets of Laredo", 2005, 17' VM
Prem. October 9, 2006 Oxford, Miss. (US), The Mississippi Brass; Rec. VMM 2043, 2005, 
The Mississippi Brass 
2 tpt. hn. trb. tuba
Diversion for Brass, 1964, 5', VM
Premiere: November 14, 1964, Atlanta, Georgia, Georgia State University Brass Quartet
Rec. VMM 2043, 2007, The Niagara Brass
2 tp, hn, trb or euphonium
Short Suite for Brass Quartet, 1960, 6',VM
Premiere: November 9, 1963, Atlanta, Georgia, Georgia State University Brass Quartet
Rec. VMM 2039, 2005, Niagara Brass
2 tp, trb, bass trb

Music for Percussion
Suite for Marimba, 2000, 10', VM
Prem. April 5, 2005, University of Mississippi, Ricky Burkhead
Teufelstanz, 1988, 14', VM
Premiere: February 24, 1989,"Musica Viva", Herculessaal, Münchner Residenz, Munich,
Kraków Percussion Ensemble; Recordings: VMM CD 2015, 1995, UNI Percussion
Ensemble and VMM CD 2039, 2005, same
6 percussion

Music for Mixed Ensemble
Trio for Horn, Violin, and Piano, 2006, see under Music for Brass.
Trio for Clarinet, Bassoon and Piano, 2005, VM
Divertimento for Harp and String Quintet, 1996, 18', VM
See under Music for Strings
Music for MW2, 1985, 13', VM
Premiere: February 10, 1989, North South Consonance, New York City
fl, vc, pf-4 Hands, l perc
Trio for Bassoon, Percussion and Piano, 1980, 14', VM
Premiere: December 7, 1980, Honolulu, Hawaii, Paul Barrett, bn, William Wiley, perc, Nancy Van de Vate, pf
Music for Viola, Percussion and Piano, 1976, 16', VM
Premiere: February 27, 1977, Honolulu, Hawaii, Maxine-Karen Johnson, va, William Wiley, perc, Stephen Salazar, pf. Recordings: VMM 2001, 1990, Maxine-Karen Johnson, va, William Wiley, perc, Evelyn Zuckerman, pf and VMM 2039, 2005, Arthur Klima, va, Andrew Pongracz, perc, Eric Zioleck, pf
Quintet 1975, 1975, 13', VM
Premiere: 12.01.1976, Honolulu, Hawaii
fl, vn, cl, vc, pf

Choral Music
Cantata for Women's Voices, 1979, Texts: James Joyce, Walt Whitman, Charles Baudelaire, anon. Provençal 12th century BC, 19', VM
Premiere: April 1, 1982, Los Angeles, California, Veil of Isis, Joan Gallegos, Cond.
SSAA, picc, fl, cl, hp, cel, 2 perc
An American Essay, 1972, Texts: Walt Whitman, 30', VM
Premiere: May 16, 1972, Knoxville Choral Society, Knoxville, Tennessee, J. B. Lyle, Cond.
Janice Clarke, Soprano
SATB, pf, l perc
The Pond, 1970, Text: Annette von Droste-Hülsoff, trans. Herman Salinger, 4'30", VM
Premiere: 1970, Orlando, Florida. Recording: VMM 3025, 1994, Chorus Soranus, Knud Vad, Cond. and VMM 2039, 2005, Chorus Ars Brunensis, Roman Valek, Cond.
SATB a cappella
How Fares the Night? 1959, 4',VM
Premiere: May 29, 1977, Honolulu, Hawaii, Text: anon. 5th century BC, trans. Mimi Tsoi
SSA, pf
Make A Joyful Noise, 1972, 4' (William Huntley, Pseudonym), Text: Psalm 98:4-6, 4', Montgomery Music Inc.
SATB, pf or organ 
Psalm 121, 1958, 4', VM
Premiere: June 30, 1974, St. John's Episcopal Choir, Knoxville, Tennessee
SATB a cappella

Vocal music
Listening to the Night, 2001, Text: John Unterecker, VM
Prem. March 18, 2003, Michelle Vought, Normal IL (US)
Soprano and seven instruments (fl., vib., 2 vn, va., vc, db)
To the East and to the West, 1972, Text: Walt Whitman, 3',VM
Premiere: May 16, 1972, Bettie Mason, soprano, Nancy Van de Vate, piano, Knoxville TN
Four Somber Songs, 1970, Texts: Georg Trakl, Edgar Allan Poe, William Blake, Paul
Verlaine, 11',VM
Premiere: October 21, 1973, Bettie Mason, sop, Nancy Van de Vate, pf, Oak Ridge, TN
The Earth is So Lovely, 1962, Text: Heinrich Heine, trans. Kate Flores, 3', VM
Premiere: Autumn 1962, Juanita Kirkpatrick, mezzo, Nancy Van de Vate, pf,
Oxford, Miss. Rec. VMM 2028, 2005, Evelyn Petros, sop., N. Van de Vate, pf
Loneliness, 1960, Text: Rainer Maria Rilke, 2', VM
Premiere: 1960, Oxford, Miss, J. Kirkpatrick, mezzo, N. Van de Vate, pf.. Rec. VMM 2028, 2005, Evelyn Petros, sop, N. Van de Vate, pf

Electronic Music
Invention No. l (Tape), 1972, 2', VM
Premiere: May 20, 1973, Knoxville, Tennessee
Wind Chimes (Tape), 1972, 3', VM
Premiere: May 20, 1973, Knoxville, Tennessee
Satellite Music (Tape), 1972, 6', VM
Premiere: May 20, 1973, Knoxville, Tennessee

Music for Piano Instruction
Twilight, 1963, Summy Birchard
Topsy Turvy, 1964, (Helen Huntley, Pseudonym), Montgomery Music Co.
Syncopated Soldier, 1964, (Helen Huntley, Pseudonym), Montgomery Music Co.
Mississippi Twilight, 1969, (Helen Huntley, Pseudonym), Montgomery Music Co.
Bicycle Ride, 1969, (Helen Huntley, Pseudonym), Montgomery Music Co.
Hoe-Down, 1970, (Helen Huntley, Pseudonym), Willis Music Co.

Further reading
 Laurdella Foulkes-Levy and Burt Levy, Journeys Through the Life and Music of Nancy Van de Vate (Scarecrow Press, 2004)

References

Sources
3. The New Grove Dictionary Of Women Composers, edited by Julie Anne Sadie and Rhian Samuel

4. The Pandora Guide To Women Composers, Britain and the United States 1629–Present, Sophie Fuller

5.International Who's Who In Music and Musicians' Directory (in the Classical and Light Classical Fields), Volume One 1998/99, Sixteenth Edition

6. Lexikon zeitgenössischer Musik aus Österreich, Komponisten und Komponistinnen des 20. Jahrhunderts, mica

7. Komponistinnen aus 800 Jahren, Olivier/ Braun

External links
http://www.naxos.com/person/Nancy_Van_de_Vate/94494.htm
http://beta.freelibrary.org/vufind/Search/Results?lookfor=Nancy+Van+de+Vate&searchType=simple&site=default_collection&client=default_frontend&proxystylesheet=default_frontend&output=xml_no_dtd&submit.x=19&submit.y=5
http://www.musicaneo.com/de/search.html?q=nancy+van+de+vate
Two interviews with Nancy Van de Vate , August 30, 1990 and August 27, 1998

1930 births
Living people
Austrian classical composers
Austrian women classical composers
American women classical composers
American classical composers
American people of Dutch descent
Austrian opera composers
American expatriates in Austria
Musicians from Plainfield, New Jersey
Eastman School of Music alumni
University of Mississippi alumni
Florida State University alumni
Dartmouth College alumni
University of New Hampshire alumni
American opera composers
Women opera composers
Classical musicians from New Jersey
21st-century American women